The Kurtzke Expanded Disability Status Scale (EDSS) is a method of quantifying disability in multiple sclerosis. The scale has been developed by John F. Kurtzke.  The EDSS is based on a neurological examination by a clinician. However, a number of versions have been developed which enable patient self-administration.

The EDSS quantifies disability in eight Functional Systems (FS) by assigning a Functional System Score (FSS) in each of these functional systems. It consists of ordinal rating system ranging from 0 (normal neurological status) to 10 (death due to MS) in 0.5 increments interval (when reaching EDSS 1). The lower scale values of the EDSS measure impairments based on the neurological examination, while the upper range of the scale (> EDSS 6) measures handicaps of patients with MS. The determination of EDSS 4 – 6 is heavily dependent on aspects of walking ability.

The EDSS is the most widely used measurement tool to describe disease progression in patients with MS and to assess the effectiveness of therapeutic interventions in clinical trials. Nonetheless, it has many criticisms, including the fact that it has moderate intra-rater reliability (EDSS kappa values between 0.32 to 0.76 and between 0.23 to 0.58 for the individual FSs were reported), offers poor assessment of upper limb and cognitive function, and lacks linearity between score difference and clinical severity. Other limitations of EDSS include that it relies heavily on the evaluation of motor function and the ability to walk; as such, a patient who might not be able to walk but maintains full dexterity is classified toward the severe end of the scale.

Other validated assessment measures used in MS trials include the Timed 25-Foot Walk, the Multiple Sclerosis Functional Composite, and the Short Form (36) Health Survey.



Functional systems
Kurtzke defines functional systems as follows:

pyramidal 
cerebellar 
brainstem 
sensory
bowel and bladder 
visual 
cerebral 
other

Results and clinical meaning
EDSS steps 1.0 to 4.5 refer to people with MS who are fully ambulatory. EDSS steps 5.0 to 9.5 are defined by the impairment to ambulation.

The clinical meaning of each possible result is the following:
0.0: Normal Neurological Exam
1.0: No disability, minimal signs in 1 FS
1.5: No disability, minimal signs in more than 1 FS
2.0: Minimal disability in 1 FS
2.5: Mild disability in 1 or Minimal disability in 2 FS
3.0: Moderate disability in 1 FS or mild disability in 3 - 4 FS, though fully ambulatory
3.5: Fully ambulatory but with moderate disability in 1 FS and mild disability in 1 or 2 FS; or moderate disability in 2 FS; or mild disability in 5 FS 
4.0: Fully ambulatory without aid, up and about 12hrs a day despite relatively severe disability. Able to walk without aid 500 meters
4.5: Fully ambulatory without aid, up and about much of day, able to work a full day, may otherwise have some limitations of full activity or require minimal assistance. Relatively severe disability. Able to walk without aid 300 meters
5.0: Ambulatory without aid for about 200 meters. Disability impairs full daily activities
5.5: Ambulatory for 100 meters, disability precludes full daily activities
6.0: Intermittent or unilateral constant assistance (cane, crutch or brace) required to walk 100 meters with or without resting
6.5: Constant bilateral support (cane, crutch or braces) required to walk 20 meters without resting
7.0: Unable to walk beyond 5 meters even with aid, essentially restricted to wheelchair, wheels self, transfers alone; active in wheelchair about 12 hours a day 
7.5: Unable to take more than a few steps, restricted to wheelchair, may need aid to transfer; wheels self, but may require motorized chair for full day's activities
8.0: Essentially restricted to bed, chair, or wheelchair, but may be out of bed much of day; retains self care functions, generally effective use of arms
8.5: Essentially restricted to bed much of day, some effective use of arms, retains some self care functions
9.0: Helpless bed patient, can communicate and eat
9.5: Unable to communicate effectively or eat/swallow
10.0: Death due to MS

External links 
 Online EDSS calculator

References 

Diagnostic neurology
Multiple sclerosis
Medical scales